Berndt Edvin Mattiasson (16 or 18 April 1890 – 15 March 1975) was a Greco-Roman wrestler from Sweden who won a bronze medal in the lightweight division at the 1912 Summer Olympics.

His official records were mixed up, listing his birth date either as 16 or 18 April. They also named him Mathiasson, while he called himself Mattiasson through most of his life. In 1916 he married Selma Karolina, a woman one year his elder who survived him by 12 years.

References

External links
 

1890 births
1975 deaths
Wrestlers at the 1912 Summer Olympics
Swedish male sport wrestlers
Olympic wrestlers of Sweden
Olympic bronze medalists for Sweden
Olympic medalists in wrestling
Medalists at the 1912 Summer Olympics
People from Trelleborg
Sportspeople from Skåne County